Larry Walsh is a Democratic member of the Illinois House of Representatives from the 86th district. The 86th district includes all or parts of Channahon, Elwood, Joliet, Ingalls Park, Preston Heights and Rockdale. Walsh was appointed to the Illinois House on April 30, 2012, after the resignation of Jack McGuire.

As of July 3, 2022, Representative Walsh is a member of the following Illinois House committees:

 Counties & Townships Committee (HCOT)
 Energy & Environment Committee (HENG)
 Health Care Licenses Committee (HHCL)
 Police & Fire Committee (SHPF)
 Prescription Drug Affordability Committee (HPDA)
 (Chairman of) Public Utilities Committee (HPUB)
 (Chairman of) Small Cell Subcommittee (HPUB-SCEL)
 (Chairman of) Telecom/Video Subcommittee (HPUB-TVID)

References

External links
Representative Lawrence M. Walsh Jr. (D) 86th District at the Illinois General Assembly
By session: 98th, 97th
Larry Walsh Jr. for State Representative
 
Rep. Lawrence Walsh at Illinois House Democrats

Year of birth missing (living people)
Living people
Democratic Party members of the Illinois House of Representatives
21st-century American politicians